The Caparo River is a river which drains into the Gulf of Paria on the west coast of Trinidad. It flows through the town of Chaguanas.

References

See also 
 List of rivers in Trinidad and Tobago
 Caparo River, Venezuela

Rivers of Trinidad and Tobago
Trinidad (island)
Gulf of Paria